The following is a list of South African airports by passenger movements.

Statistics

All information below is sourced from the annual statistics published by the Airports Company South Africa. Figures are between 1 April and 31 March the following year.

Airports not controlled by the Airports Company South Africa do not generally publish passenger statistics, and have not been included.

At a glance

2020–2022 COVID-19
During the lockdowns for the COVID-19 pandemic, most commercial flights were halted at first.

2012–13

2011–12

2010–11

2009–10

2007–08

2006–07

2005–06

2004–05

See also

 List of airports in South Africa

References

External links
 Airports Company of South Africa

airports by passenger movements
List, passenger movements
So